Hosono House is the debut solo album of Japanese musician Haruomi Hosono, released on May 25, 1973.

Background and recording
Besides Hosono, this album also features performances by the group "Caramel Mama" (featuring Hosono's fellow Happy End member Shigeru Suzuki). Hosono wanted to emulate The Band's Music from Big Pink and James Taylor's One Man Dog. With this album, recording equipment technology had evolved enough for domestic recordings of good quality to be feasible, and going to the center of the city to reach a recording studio was somewhat inconvenient. The album was recorded for five hours every afternoon in a 144 square foot large bedroom in Hosono's residence in Sayama, Japan with a 16-track mixing console in his living room. The instruments were recorded unprocessed from the amplifiers in a small room, leading to the album's unique sound. Hosono continued to develop the tropical style of Hosono House in his following works, Tropical Dandy and Bon Voyage co..

Track listing

Personnel
 Haruomi Hosono - Bass, Guitar, Flat Mandolin, Vocal, Melodica, Thumb piano (on "Party"), Piano (on "Party"), Horn (Wind and Brass) Arrangements, Production, Sony TC-9400
 Masataka Matsutoya - Piano, Fender Rhodes, Accordion
 Shigeru Suzuki - Electric guitar
 Tatsuo Hayashi - Drums, Percussion
 Hiroki Komazawa - Steel guitar
 Kinji Yoshino - Horn Arrangements, Engineering, Re-Mix Engineering
 Masaki Nomura - Engineering
Production
 Shinzo Ishiura, WIND CORPORATION - Management
 Ritsu Kamimura - Transportation
 Misako Hosono - Cooking
 Mitsunori Miura (for BELLWOOD RECORDS) - Executive Production
 Masahiro Nogami - Photography
 WORK SHOP MU!! - Art Direction
 VERANSKY MIKKO MOKKO MINAKO, YAMAZAKI & Neighbour Foods - Special Thanks
 CITY MUSIC CORPORATION - Publishing
 ALFA MUSIC - Publishing for "Owari no Kisetsu"
 SHINKO MUSIC - Publishing for "Aiaigasa"
Reissue staff
 Mitsunori Miura - Supervision
 Ēji Ogura - Auxiliary Supervision
 Masakazu Kitanaka - Liner Notes
 Junichi Yamada - Liner Notes Editing
 Hiroyuki Tsuji - Remastering Engineering
 Approach - Design
 Junichi Yamashita - Design Coordination
 Katsumi Miyata & Jōwa Honda - A&R

References 

1973 albums
Haruomi Hosono albums
Japanese-language albums